The 2003 Artistic World Skating Championships was the second Artistic Skating World Championship. The event was held in the Luna Park Stadium, in Buenos Aires, Argentina.

The championship was held between 8 and 23 November 2003.

Results

Senior Men's Freestyle

Senior Ladies Freestyle

Senior Pairs

Senior Dance

Senior Men Inline

Senior Women Inline

References

World Championships
Sports competitions in Buenos Aires
International sports competitions hosted by Argentina